Fred R. Price (1927 – June 25, 2015) was an American art director and set decorator. He was nominated for two Primetime Emmy Awards in the category Outstanding Art Direction for his work on the television program Mannix. Price died in June 2015 in Sherman Oaks, California, at the age of 88. He was buried in Eden Memorial Park Cemetery.

References

External links 

1927 births
2015 deaths
Date of birth missing
Place of birth missing
American art directors
American set decorators
Burials at Eden Memorial Park Cemetery